Pathum Thani is one of the central provinces (changwat) of Thailand. Neighboring provinces are (from north clockwise): Phra Nakhon Si Ayutthaya, Saraburi, Nakhon Nayok, Chachoengsao, Bangkok, and Nonthaburi.

The province is north of Bangkok and is part of the Bangkok metropolitan area. In many places, the boundary between the two provinces is not noticeable as both sides of the boundary are equally urbanized. Pathum Thani town is the administrative seat, but Ban Rangsit, seat of Thanyaburi district, is the largest populated place in the province.

Pathum Thani is an old province, heavily populated by the Mon people, dotted with 186 temples and parks. The Dream World amusement park is here.

Geography
The province lies on the low alluvial flats of the Chao Phraya River that flows through the capital. Many canals (khlongs) cross the province and feed the rice paddies. There is no forest area in the province.

History
The city dates back to a settlement founded by Mon migrating from Mottama (Thai: เมาะตะมะ) in Myanmar around 1650. The original name was Sam Khok.[6]:230,369 In 1815, King Rama II visited the city and the citizens offered him many lotus flowers, which prompted the king to rename the city Pathum Thani, meaning 'lotus flower town'.[7]
The city dates back to a settlement founded by Mon migrating from Mottama in Myanmar around 1650. The original name was Sam Khok. In 1815, King Rama II visited the city and the citizens offered him many lotus flowers, which prompted the king to rename the city Pathum Thani, meaning 'lotus flower town'.

Symbols
The provincial seal shows a pink lotus flower with two rice stalks bending over it, representing the fertility of the province. The provincial tree is the Indian coral tree (Erythrina variegata). The provincial flower is the lotus (Nymphaea lotus).

Education and technology
Pathum Thani has a very high concentration of higher education institutions, especially ones in the field of science and technology. This, together with a large number of industrial parks and research facilities (including those in Thailand Science Park), make the region the educational and technology hub of the area.

 Academic institutes
 National Science Museum, Asian Institute of Technology, Bangkok University (Rangsit Campus), Eastern Asia University,  North Bangkok University (Rangsit), Pathumthani University, Rajamangala University of Technology, Rangsit University, Shinawatra University, Sirindhorn International Institute of Technology, Thammasat University (Rangsit Center, and Valaya Alongkorn - Rajahbaht University).

 Research bodies
 Thailand Science Park, National Science and Technology Development Agency (NSTDA), National Center for Genetic Engineering and Biotechnology (BIOTEC), National Metal and Materials Technology Center (MTEC), National Nanotechnology Center (NANOTEC), National Electronics and Computer Technology Center (NECTEC), Thai Microelectronics Center (TMEC), Thailand Institute of Scientific and Technological Research (TISTR), TOT Innovation Institute (TOT)

 Industrial parks
 Software Park Thailand (in Nonthaburi, southwest of Pathum Thani), Nava Nakorn Industrial Promotion Zone (1376 acres / 5.6 km2), Bangkadi Industrial Park (470 acres / 1.9 km2), Techno Thani (a "Technology City" administered by the Ministry of Science and Technology), and a number of industrial parks in neighboring Ayutthaya and Nonthaburi provinces.

Administrative divisions

Provincial government

The province is divided into seven districts (amphoes). The districts are further subdivided into 60 communes (tambons) and 529 villages (mubans).

Local government
As of 29 September 2020 there are: one Pathum Thani Provincial Administrative Organization - PAO and twenty-nine municipal (thesaban) areas in the province. Rangsit has city (thesaban nakhon) status. Further ten have town (thesaban mueang) status and eighteen subdistrict  municipalities (thesaban tambon).

The non-municipal areas are administered by 35 Subdistrict Administrative
Organizations - SAO (ongkan borihan suan tambon).

Human achievement index 2017

Since 2003, United Nations Development Programme (UNDP) in Thailand has tracked progress on human development at sub-national level using the Human achievement index (HAI), a composite index covering all the eight key areas of human development. National Economic and Social Development Board (NESDB) has taken over this task since 2017.

References

External links

 Pathum Thani; Tourist Authority of Thailand
 

 
Provinces of Thailand